LTD or Ltd may refer to:

Business and finance 
 Private company limited by shares, a class of company in the UK and some Commonwealth nations
 Limited company, a class of company in several countries with limited liability

Music 
 LTD (album), a 1998 album by Buck-Tick
 L.T.D. (band) (for "Love, Togetherness and Devotion"), a 1970s funk music group

Science and technology 
 Linear transformer driver, which generates short high-current pulses
 Long-term depression, in physiology, an hours-long reduction in the efficacy of synapses

Transportation 
 Ford LTD (Americas), a series of vehicles produced 1965–1986
 Ford LTD (Australia), a series of vehicles produced 1973–2007
 Lane Transit District, a public transportation agency in Oregon, US

Other uses 
 LTD, a brand of guitars and basses made by ESP Guitars
 LTD Powersports, a stock car racing team